Leopold Poetsch (or Pötsch) (18 November 1853 – 16 October 1942) was an Austrian history teacher. He was a high school teacher of Adolf Hitler and Adolf Eichmann. He influenced the future leader's later views, specifically German nationalism.

He also took some distance from his former pupil, among other things since considering Hitler had become an enemy of Austria.

Hitler credits the determining factor of the entire rest of his future life to Leopold in his book Mein Kampf.

Dr. Poetsch has been a member of the underground Nazi S.S. in Austria, which had been outlawed during Austria's independence.

References

Shirer, William L. Rise and Fall of the Third Reich: A History of Nazi Germany. Simon & Schuster, 1990. 
Pool, James Hitler and his secret partners: Contributions, Loot and Rewards, 1933–1945. Pocket Books, 1997. 
Hamann, Brigitte Hitler's Vienna: A Dictator's Apprenticeship. Oxford University Press, 1999. 
Hitler, Adolf Mein Kampf. Indialog Publications Pvt. Ltd., 2002. 
Mein Kampf, page 18, 3rd to last line
Mein Kampf, page 15

1853 births
1942 deaths
People from Linz
People of Nazi Germany
Austrian politicians
Adolf Hitler
Austrian schoolteachers